In game theory and in particular the study of Blotto games and operational research, the Gibbs lemma is a result that is useful in maximization problems. It is named for Josiah Willard Gibbs.

Consider .

Notes

References

Game theory